Nesting is a parish in the Shetland Islands, Scotland. The coast is deeply indented by voes and headlands. This includes the ancient parish of Lunnasting in the North and the island parish of Whalsay to the east, which were added to Nesting in 1891. Before that, the ancient parishes of North Nesting and South Nesting were merged.

Nesting is divided into a north and south districts. The population in 1958 was 1549.

Settlements in Nesting include:
 Benston (South Nesting)
 Billister (North Nesting)
 Brettabister (North Nesting)
 Catfirth (South Nesting)
 Dury (North Nesting)
 Freester (South Nesting)
 Gletness (South Nesting), including North and South Isles of Gletness
 Kirkabister (North Nesting)
 Laxfirth (North Nesting)
 Skellister (South Nesting)

The main village of Whalsay is Symbister and there are several notable Neolithic sites on the island, including Benie Hoose, the Standing Stones of Yoxie, and the Pettigarths Field Cairns.

Notable residents

James Stout Angus was from Nesting.
Alexander Levie born and raised here.

References
This article incorporates text from - Wilson, Rev. John The Gazetteer of Scotland (Edinburgh, 1882) Published by W. & A.K. Johnstone

External links
 Nesting & Lunnasting Community Council

Parishes of Shetland
Thing (assembly)
Whalsay
Mainland, Shetland